Stallings Island is an archeological site with shell mounds, located in the Savannah River near Augusta, Georgia.  The site is the namesake for the Stallings culture of the Late Archaic period and for Stallings fiber-tempered pottery, the oldest known pottery in North America.  The site was declared a National Historic Landmark in 1961. Stallings Island pottery found in coastal Georgia was formerly called St. Simons pottery, but is now recognized as Stallings Island.

Description and history
Stallings Island is located upriver of Augusta, in an area known as the Ninety-Nine Islands, just downriver of the mouth of Stevens Creek.   The island was occupied from about 2600 B.C.E. to about 2000 B.C.E., and again from about 1800 B.C.E. to 1400 B.C.E. The site was occupied during the first period by people of the Paris Island (ca. 2500-2200 B.C.E.) and Mill Branch (ca. 2200-1800 B.C.E.) phases, pre-ceramic traditions that harvested large numbers of freshwater mussels. During the second period the site was occupied by people of the Classic Stallings culture, who used decorated pottery. The earliest, undecorated, Stallings ceramics first appeared at other sites while Stallings Island itself was unoccupied.  The site represents a transitional period, in which hunter-gatherer culture was gradually replaced by more sedentary village and agriculture-based lifestyles.

The island was identified as an archaeological site in 1861, and has been the subject of several scientific excavations.  It has also been subject to extensive looting, and was listed for many years as a threatened landmark.  The island was acquired by the Archaeological Conservancy in 1998.

Stallings Island Middle School in Martinez, GA was named after this site.

See also
List of National Historic Landmarks in Georgia (U.S. state)
National Register of Historic Places listings in Columbia County, Georgia

References

National Historic Landmarks in Georgia (U.S. state)
Geography of Columbia County, Georgia
Archaeological sites in Georgia (U.S. state)
Archaeological sites on the National Register of Historic Places in Georgia (U.S. state)
1861 archaeological discoveries
Savannah River
National Register of Historic Places in Columbia County, Georgia
River islands of Georgia (U.S. state)